Godine is a New England based independent book publisher, known for its beautifully published and carefully selected books, primarily nonfiction, literary fiction, and poetry.

History
The company was founded in 1970 by David R. Godine who acted as publisher until his retirement in 2019. Leadership of the company was then assumed by its new president, Will Thorndike.

In March 2020, as part of a relaunch of the company, Godine joined Two Rivers Distribution, an Ingram brand, for sales of its titles to readers worldwide. While maintaining its core principles and high standards, Godine also refocused its editorial direction and now publishes books for a larger and more diverse audience of readers.

Notable authors and awards
Thomas W. Gilbert, Casey Award: Best Baseball Book of the Year, 2020
Richard Howard, National Book Award for Translated Literature, 1983
Bob Keyes, Rabkin Prize for Visual Arts Journalism, 2017
J.M.G. Le Clézio, Nobel Prize in Literature, 2008
Patrick Modiano, Nobel Prize in Literature, 2014
Richard Rodriguez, Anisfield-Wolf Book Award, 1983 Frankel Medal from the National Endowment for the Humanities, Pulitzer Prize finalist in nonfiction
Simon Van Booy, Frank O'Connor International Short Story Award, 2009

References

Book publishing companies based in Massachusetts
Publishing companies established in 1970
Companies based in Boston
1970 establishments in Massachusetts